Butyriboletus sanicibus is a pored mushroom  in the genus Butyriboletus. Found in China where it grows in association with Yunnan pine (Pinus yunnanensis), it was described as a new species in 2014.

References

External links

sanicibus
Fungi described in 2014
Fungi of Asia